Facussé or Facusse is a surname. Notable people with the surname include:

 Carlos Roberto Flores Facussé (born 1950), former President of Honduras
 Adolfo Facussé, Honduras businessman
 Miguel Facussé Barjum (1924–2015), Honduran businessman and landowner